Fournierella is a member of the Muniericeratidae, a family of Upper Cretaceous ammonites characterized by moderately evolute shells with strong sinuous ribs that have tubercles on the shoulders and umbilical edge, and a more or less fastigate cross section (venter sloping on either side like a gable roof), included in the Desmocerataceae. It may be a subgenus of Pseudoschloenbachia.

References

Arkell, et al., 1957., Mesozoic Ammonoidea, Treatise on Invertebrate Paleontology Part L, Ammonoiea.  Geological Society of America and University of Kansas Press.
Sepkoski's list of cephalopod genera. 

Cretaceous ammonites
Santonian life
Desmoceratoidea
Ammonitida genera